"Dominos" is the first single from The Big Pink's debut album A Brief History of Love. "Dominos" was released as a digital download and on 7" vinyl on September 7, 2009, a week before the release of the album. The song was co-produced by the band and record producer Paul Epworth, and mixed by Rich Costey (who also produced the album). In their native United Kingdom, the song peaked on the UK Singles Chart at #27 and #10 on the Irish Singles Chart in the Republic of Ireland. The single's B-side, "She's No Sense", features vocals from Florence Welch of Florence and the Machine.

"Dominos" is The Big Pink's fourth single, three having been released before their debut album throughout 2008 and 2009. The song was remixed by Switch and made available as a free digital download track on the band's website on October 23, 2009. "Dominos" has also been featured in Xbox 360 television advertisements in the United Kingdom. In the United States, the song was used in a promo spot for Skins series 3 premiere on BBC America. The song was featured in the episode "Let The Games Begin" of 90210.

On Pitchfork Media's end-of-the-year Top 100 Tracks of 2009 list, "Dominos" was voted in at #18. On February 24, 2010, "Dominos" won Best Track of the Year at the NME Awards.  In October 2011, NME placed it at number 72 on its list "150 Best Tracks of the Past 15 Years".

The song is heavily sampled on Nicki Minaj's track "Girls Fall Like Dominoes" on her debut album Pink Friday.

Track listing
7" vinyl (AD 2931) and download
 "Dominos" – 3:48
 "She's No Sense" – 3:15

Remixes
 "Dominos" (Rustie Remix), 3:22 – available as a bonus track exclusively with the UK iTunes version of A Brief History of Love
 "Dominos" (Switch Remix), 5:32 – available as a free download on the band's website in October 2009
 "Dominos" (Switch Remix Instrumental), 5:18 – also available from the band's website in October 2009

Charts

Credits
 All music and vocals by Robbie Furze and Milo Cordell
"Dominos"
 Produced by The Big Pink and Paul Epworth
 Valentine Fillol-Cordier – backing vocals
 Akiko Matsuura – drums
 Engineered by Mark Rankin
 Mixed by Rich Costey
"She's No Sense"
 Produced and mixed by The Big Pink
 Florence Welch – vocals
 Art direction by The Big Pink
 Design by Chris Bigg
 Photography by Marc Atkins at panoptika.net

References

The Big Pink songs
2009 singles
4AD singles
2009 songs
Song recordings produced by Paul Epworth